Joshua Kirton was an English bookseller and publisher, responsible (sometimes with Thomas Warren) for the dissemination of a number of important works in the seventeenth century, including Francis Godwin's The Man in the Moone. His London business in Paul's Churchyard was destroyed in the 1666 Great Fire of London.

Kirton's notable clients included Samuel Pepys.

References

People of the Industrial Revolution
English booksellers
Year of death unknown
Year of birth unknown